Senftenberg is a town in Lower Lusatia, Brandenburg, Germany, capital of the Oberspreewald-Lausitz district.

Geography
Senftenberg is located in the southwest of the historic Lower Lusatia region at the border with Saxony.

Senftenberg station is north of the centre and a major railway freight yard is located to its north-east, with a locomotive depot.

History

Senftenberg was first mentioned in a 1279 deed issued by Henry III the Illustrious of Wettin, then margrave of Lusatia. With Lower Lusatia, the settlement was acquired by the Kingdom of Bohemia under Charles IV of Luxembourg in 1368. Elector Frederick II of Saxony acquired Senftenberg in 1448, whereafter the area as a border stronghold of the House of Wettin was separated from Bohemian Lusatia, until in 1635 all Lusatian territories fell to Saxony by the Peace of Prague. According to the 1815 Congress of Vienna, Lower Lusatia was annexed by Prussia and incorporated into the Province of Brandenburg. From 1952 to 1990, it was part of the Bezirk Cottbus of East Germany.

Names

Lake Senftenberg

Lake Senftenberg is a popular tourist destination. In 1973, the former open cast mine, was officially opened to the public. Today, the lake is known for its excellent water quality. It is part of the so-called Lusatian Lakeland, a group of 23 artificial lakes.

Demography
After the second half of the 19th century the inhabitants increased because of workers coming to Senftenberg to work in the coal mines. After the German Reunion, many inhabitants moved to the western part of Germany.

Sports
In Senftenberg is the soccer club FSV Glückauf Brieske-Senftenberg.

Twin towns – sister cities

Senftenberg is twinned with:

 Fresagrandinaria, Italy
 Nowa Sól, Poland
 Püttlingen, Germany
 Saint-Michel-sur-Orge, France
 Senftenberg, Austria
 Veszprém, Hungary
 Žamberk, Czech Republic

Notable people
Hermann Kuhnt (1850–1925), ophthalmologist
Herbert Windt (1894–1965), composer
Joachim Sauer (born 1949), chemist and professor

Gallery

References

External links

 

 
Populated places in Oberspreewald-Lausitz